Matías Sebastián Rojas (born 3 January 1991) is an Argentine footballer who plays as a midfielder for San Miguel.

Career
Rojas began his career with Primera B Metropolitana's Deportivo Armenio. His professional debut arrived on 11 September 2012 when Rojas featured in a match with Atlanta, playing the full duration of a 3–1 defeat. In the final months of 2012–13, Rojas scored his first professional goals in fixtures with Comunicaciones and Flandria. After two seasons in Deportivo Armenio's first-team, Rojas was loaned out to Atlanta for the 2014 Primera B Metropolitana season. Thirteen appearances followed, prior to him returning to his parent club and subsequently featuring in sixty-three matches in the next two and a half years with the club.

2017 saw Rojas complete a move to fellow third tier outfit Acassuso. He was selected just five times in his first campaign of 2016–17, but followed that up with thirty-five appearances and one goal in 2017–18. On 19 June 2018, Rojas joined Paraguayan Primera División side Deportivo Santaní. He departed at the end of December, having made just three appearances for the Paraguayans. A return to Acassuso was sealed in January 2019.

Career statistics
.

References

External links

1991 births
Living people
Footballers from Buenos Aires
Argentine footballers
Association football midfielders
Argentine expatriate footballers
Primera B Metropolitana players
Primera C Metropolitana players
Paraguayan Primera División players
Deportivo Armenio footballers
Club Atlético Atlanta footballers
Club Atlético Acassuso footballers
Deportivo Santaní players
Club Atlético San Miguel footballers
Argentine expatriate sportspeople in Paraguay
Expatriate footballers in Paraguay